Empis tanysphyra is a species of dance flies, in the fly family Empididae. It is included in the subgenus Empis. It is found in most of central and southern Europe.

The wing length is 3.9-4.6 mm for males and 4-4.6 mm for females.

References

External links
Fauna Europaea

Empis
Asilomorph flies of Europe
Insects described in 1873
Taxa named by Hermann Loew